The New South Wales Physical Disability Rugby League Association (NSWPDRLA) is an amateur open age rugby league competition for people with a Physical disability.

History
The NSWPDRL was formed in 2010 and co founded by George Tonna. They then affiliated with the New South Wales Rugby League and established two teams the Eastern Sydney Stingrays and Western Sydney Outlaws and were playing exhibition matches from 2010 to 2012. Two new clubs entered in 2013 the Manly Sea Eagles and Newtown Jets for players based in the North Shore and Sydney City areas.

The Manly Sea Eagles are the current champions as they defeated South Sydney 12–4 in the 2015 grand final.

Rules
The rules are the same as top level rugby league but have been modified to make the game safer for disabled bodied and younger players;
9 a side although in some cases 13 are used.
Scoring is the same as usual, 4 points for a try and 2 for a conversion.
Red shorts players play touch in both attack and defence.
Black shorts players play standard tackle rules.
Knock ons are counted as a tackle.
No scrums.
Able bodied players can participate but no more than 2 are allowed on the field at any time, they cannot score tries, kick goals or kick in general play.

Current Clubs
There are currently 4 teams in the competition but there are plans to expand the competition further across NSW, Australia and overseas.

References

External links
NSW Physical Disability Rugby League

Rugby league competitions in New South Wales
Rugby league in Sydney
Amateur rugby league
2010 establishments in Australia
Sports leagues established in 2010
Parasports organisations in Australia
Disability in Australia
Physical Disability Rugby League